The Academia de Prospecto Complex is a stadium complex in San Antonio de Guerra, Dominican Republic.  It is the home of the Dominican Summer League Indians and the Dominican Summer League Indians/Brewers. It is also where the Cleveland Indians organization conducts all of its Latin American operations.

History
The stadium officially opened in May 2011, and since then it has been used to train the Dominican Summer League Indians. It is where the team plays its home games. As of the 2017 DSL season, the DSL Indians/Brewers cooperative team also plays its home games at the Academia de Prospecto Complex.

Facilities
Chris Antonetti, current President of the Cleveland Indians, described the academy as "state-of-the-art". The academy was designed to prepare young Dominican players for a future career with the Indians in Major League Baseball. It has multiple fields for the players to practice on, as well as training mounds, batting tunnels, a classroom where the players can learn English, and other indoor training facilities and recreational areas.

Staff
Jose Mejia is currently serving as the manager and field coordinator of the DSL Indians. He is aided by Carlos Fermin, who is working as the infield coach. In addition to the coaches, the Cleveland Indians' scouting staff, which is led by Koby Perez, will operate through the academy.

References

External links 
 http://www.dominicansummerleague.com/www/
 http://cleveland.indians.mlb.com/news/press_releases/press_release.jsp?ymd=20110516&content_id=19134480&vkey=pr_cle&fext=.jsp&c_id=cle
 http://mlb.mlb.com/dr/index.jsp
 http://www.milb.com/index.jsp?sid=l130
 https://web.archive.org/web/20110710143547/http://www.dominicansummerleague.com/index.php?option=com_content&view=article&id=1590%3Aliga-de-verano-presenta-calendario&catid=38%3Asports 
Dominican Summer League
Minor league baseball venues
Baseball venues in the Dominican Republic
Sports venues completed in 2011